is a single by a Japanese American singer Kylee. The title track is the theme song for the film Signal: Luca on Mondays.

Release history

Track listing
Regular edition CD single

Limited edition CD single

Personnel

"Mirai"
vocals : Kylee
sound produce & all other instruments : CHOKKAKU
vocal arrangement & direction : Naohisa Taniguchi
electric bass : Takeshi Taneda
strings : Gen Ittetsu Strings

"Feel"
vocals : Kylee
sound produce & all other instruments : Tomokazu "T.O.M" Matsuzawa
vocal arrangement & direction : Naohisa Taniguchi
electric bass : Kota Hahimoto

"Mirai" (Signalized Ver.)
vocals : Kylee
sound produce & all other instruments : Naohisa Taniguchi
vocal arrangement & direction : Naohisa Taniguchi
electric bass : Masato Suzuki
strings : Okamura Mio Strings

Limited edition bonus DVD
 "Mirai" music video
only Kylee's scenes ver.
director - Toshiyuki Suzuki
 live concert footage
on October 10, 2011 at Shibuya Boxx, Tokyo
vocals - Kylee / keyboard - Troy Laureta / guitar - Chris Vasquez / bass - Bana Mendoza / drums - Valerie Franco

Music video
"Mirai" has two music videos. One is created of only Kylee's scenes. The other features scenes from the film Signal: Luca on Mondays. Kylee's scenes were filmed in Sedona, Arizona.
The music video of "Feel" was filmed in Arizona. It features her little sister Ashley.

Live performances
in support of the single "Mirai"
the late night music TV show Count Down TV 
Setlist 1. Mirai
Performers vocals- Kylee guitar- Seira & Risa Ishibashi bass- Tomi drums- Mai Imamura strings quartet- 
three concerts in Kawasaki & Nishinomiya
Setlist 1. It's You 2. Feel 3. Mirai 4. Crazy For You
Performers vocal- Kylee keyboards- Nino guitar- Risa Ishibashi

References

External links
  by DefStar Records

2012 singles
2012 songs